Carl Gustav Arvid Olof Croneberg (April 26, 1930 – August 7, 2022) was a Swedish-American Deaf linguist known for his work on American Sign Language (ASL).

Background 
Croneberg was born in 1930 in Norrbacka, near Stockholm, and graduated from Gallaudet University in 1955 with bachelor's degree in English.

Career

In 1958, Croneberg was recruited by William C. Stokoe to work in a research laboratory for a linguistic analysis of the language of signs. Alongside researchers William C. Stokoe and Dorothy S. Casterline, he noticed that ASL has a linguistic system (phonology, morphology, syntax). They recognized ASL as a natural language with its own rules of grammar and syntax. Later, he was a co-writer of A Dictionary of American Sign Language on Linguistic Principles, with Stokoe and Casterline. In the book, Croneberg gave an early ethnographic and sociological portrait on the Deaf community and its regional dialects.

Croneberg was one of the first sociologists to use the term "culture" to describe signing deaf Americans' way of life, and was the first to discuss the differences between Black ASL and white ASL. The term was first written in uppercase as "Deaf culture" in 1975. The work on Deaf Culture and Black American Sign Language continues. Croneberg knew four languages: Swedish, German, English and ASL. He taught in the English department at Gallaudet University for 30 years until his retirement in 1986.

On May 13, 2022, Croneberg was awarded an honorary degree, Doctor of Humane Letters degree from Gallaudet University for his pioneer work in American Sign Language research.

Personal life and death
Croneberg was married to the former Eleanor Wetzel, and had two daughters and a son. He died on August 7, 2022, at the age of 92.

Publications 
Stokoe, William C.; Dorothy C. Casterline; Carl G. Croneberg. 1965. A Dictionary of American Sign Language on Linguistic Principles. Washington, D.C.: Gallaudet College Press

References 

1930 births
2022 deaths
Deaf culture
Gallaudet University faculty
Linguists from Sweden
Linguists from the United States
Naturalized citizens of the United States
Place of death missing
Swedish emigrants to the United States
Swedish deaf people
Scientists with disabilities